The Chance Liga is the second-highest level of professional ice hockey in the Czech Republic, after the Extraliga. It began in 1993 and is run and administered by Czech Ice Hockey Association.

Until 2015, the league was known as the 1st Czech National Hockey League. It was then known as the WSM Liga until 2018.

Format (2022-23)
In the first phase, every team plays each other four times—twice at home and twice away—which makes for a 52-game regular season.

After the 52-game regular season, the first six teams directly qualify for the quarter-finals, while teams which placed 7 to 10 play a round-robin to determine the final two participants in the quarter-finals.

The playoffs end with the finals, with the winning team go on to face the bottom team from the Extraliga in a round-robin. The winner of the round-robin is promoted to Extraliga for the following season.

The last placed team at the end of the regular season is directly relegated to the Second League for the following season. They are replaced by the winner of a 3 team round-robin group between the winners of the East, the Central and the West divisions of the Second League.

Three points are awarded for a win in regulation time and two points for an overtime or shootout victory, while the team defeated in overtime or shootout gets one point.

The level of 1. národní hokejová liga is slightly lower than the Czech Extraliga, but there are a lot of players moving between those two leagues every season. Each team in this league is allowed to have five imports. The league has no salary cap, with an average salary of USD 2200 per month, but some of the best players reportedly sign contracts for more than USD 5000 per month, plus most of the teams cover accommodation expenses for their players during the season.

Current teams (2022-23)

Champions
 1993–94 Vsetínská hokejová and HC Slavia Praha
 1994–95 HC Kometa Brno and TZ Třinec
 1995–96 HC Přerov and HC Opava
 1996–97 HC Becherovka Karlovy Vary and HC Kralupy nad Vltavou
 1997–98 HC Znojemští Orli
 1998–99 HC Znojemští Orli
 1999–2000 HC Dukla Jihlava
 2000–01 KLH Chomutov
 2001–02 HC Bílí Tygři Liberec
 2002–03 HC Vagnerplast Kladno
 2003–04 HC Dukla Jihlava
 2004–05 HC České Budějovice
 2005–06 HC Slovan Ústí nad Labem
 2006–07 HC Slovan Ústí nad Labem
 2007–08 BK Mladá Boleslav
 2008–09 HC Slovan Ústečtí Lvi
 2009–10 KLH Chomutov
 2010–11 HC Slovan Ústečtí Lvi
 2011–12 Piráti Chomutov
 2012–13 BK Mladá Boleslav and HC Olomouc
 2013–14 BK Mladá Boleslav and HC Olomouc
 2014–15 Piráti Chomutov and Motor České Budějovice
 2015–16 HC Dukla Jihlava and HC Slavia Praha
 2016–17 Motor České Budějovice and HC Dukla Jihlava
 2017–18 Energie Karlovy Vary and Rytíři Kladno
 2018–19 Motor České Budějovice and Rytíři Kladno
 2019–20 Motor České Budějovice
 2020–21 Rytíři Kladno
 2021–22 HC Dukla Jihlava

External links 
 Hokej.cz
 Hokej iDNES.cz

 
Czech
Professional ice hockey leagues in the Czech Republic